Bruce Teague (born Bruce A. Teague III; July 27, 1976) is an American entrepreneur serving as the current mayor of Iowa City.

Early life and education 
Bruce Teague was born July 27, 1976, who is also known as Bruce, Junger, and Brucie. He moved to Iowa City from Chicago at 17 years old. Later, he earned his associate degree from Kirkwood Community College, a bachelor's degree in psychology  and a certificate in aging studies from the University of Iowa.

Career

Entrepreneurship 
Teague is the CEO of Caring Hands and More, whose services include and vary from home care/companionship care, parent helper, pet care, professional cleaning, lawn care, supported community living, day rehabilitation, and crisis stabilization (CSB).

Politics / Iowa City Council (2018-2022) 
On Oct 2, 2018, Teague was elected to the Iowa city council to fill the remainder of a four-year term vacated by Kingsley Botchway, who moved away from Iowa City. In early January 2020, he was appointed as Mayor of Iowa City.

See also 
 List of first African-American mayors

References 

1976 births
Living people
Politicians from Chicago
Politicians from Iowa City, Iowa
Kirkwood Community College alumni
University of Iowa alumni
Iowa city council members
Mayors of places in Iowa
African-American mayors in Iowa
21st-century African-American people
20th-century African-American people